Faruk Halilbegović (born 7 September 1987 in Sarajevo, Bosnia and Herzegovina) is a handball left back who plays for German club HF Springe. He started his career in Bosna Visoko and later played for Borac Banja Luka, Bosna Sarajevo and Sloga Doboj. With Sloga he won the title of Bosnian league for season 2011–2012. After that he played for Al-Gharafa in Qatar and TV Emsdetten in Germany. After TV Emsdetten was relegated from Handball-Bundesliga, Halilbegović signed for HF Springe in July 2015.

Honours

Club
Handball Championship of Bosnia and Herzegovina:
Winner: 2011-2012

References

1987 births
Living people
Bosnia and Herzegovina male handball players
Mediterranean Games competitors for Bosnia and Herzegovina
Competitors at the 2009 Mediterranean Games